Debra Parkes is a Canadian academic working as the professor of law and chair in feminist legal studies at the Peter A. Allard School of Law, a position she assumed on July 1, 2016.

Education 
Parkes earned a Bachelor of Arts degree from Trinity Western University, a Bachelor of Laws from the University of British Columbia, and a Master of Laws from the Columbia Law School.

Career 
Parkes began her career as a law clerk for judges on the Supreme Court of British Columbia and as a litigator at Gowlings in Toronto. She also served as the associate dean of research and graduate studies and executive director of the Legal Research Institute at Robson Hall.

See also 

 Feminist legal theory

References

External links 
 Profile at Peter A. Allard School of Law
 

Living people
Year of birth missing (living people)
Academic staff of the Robson Hall
Academic staff of the Peter A. Allard School of Law
Canadian legal scholars